The 1972 United States Senate election in Georgia took place on November 7, 1972, as one of that year's United States Senate elections. It was held concurrently with the 1972 presidential election. This seat had opened up following the death of Richard B. Russell in 1971. Shortly thereafter, Governor of Georgia Jimmy Carter appointed David H. Gambrell to fill Russell's vacant seat. The Democratic Party nominee was Sam Nunn, a conservative Democrat and member of the Georgia House of Representatives, and the Republican Party nominated Fletcher Thompson, the Representative from the Atlanta-area 5th congressional district of Georgia. In the primary, Nunn emerged victorious from a crowded field of Democratic candidates, including Gambrell and former Georgia Governor Ernest Vandiver. Despite President Richard Nixon defeating George McGovern in Georgia in the presidential election on the same day, Nunn defeated Thompson in the general election 54% to 46%.

Timeline
March 15: Nunn announces his candidacy at a rally in Perry, Georgia. Nunn's great-uncle, Carl Vinson, was among the approximately 1,500 in attendance, and he went on to give $500 to Nunn's campaign.
March 17: Thompson announces his candidacy at a gas station in Albany, Georgia.
August 8: Gambrell comes in first in the Democratic primary, with Nunn in second. Both candidates advance to a runoff because neither received over 50 percent of the vote. On the same day, Thompson decisively wins the Republican primary, receiving over 92 percent of the vote in total. In doing so, he defeated three opponents: Howard Tucker, Clarence I. Porter, and Darrell Runyan (the latter of whom also ran in the Democratic primary).
August 29: The Democratic runoff is held; Nunn defeats Gambrell with 54% of the vote. The New York Times refers to Nunn's victory as an "upset".
November 7: Nunn defeats Thompson in the general election.

Primaries
A total of fifteen candidates ran for the Democratic nomination, including incumbent Gambrell, Nunn, former governor Ernest Vandiver, segregationist J.B. Stoner, and civil rights activist Hosea Williams. In the initial round of voting on August 8, 1972, Gambrell finished first with 31.4% of the vote, followed by Nunn with 23.1%. Because no candidate received an outright majority, a runoff was held on August 29, which Nunn won.

General election

Campaign
The 1972 race focused more on candidates than on issues. Both Nunn and Thompson tried to align themselves with politicians who were viewed favorably in Georgia, and to dissociate themselves from those who were viewed unfavorably. Nunn, for example, harshly criticized his own party's nominee for President, George McGovern, pledging not to vote for him in that year's presidential election. Nunn suggested he might cast a write-in vote for George Wallace instead. Thompson, by contrast, tried to associate himself with President Richard Nixon, who was polling far ahead of McGovern in Georgia; he also distributed posters across the state linking Nunn to McGovern. As Jon Nordheimer noted in the New York Times several weeks before the election, "This maneuvering has become so frenzied, in fact, that the relative popularity of the President, Senator McGovern and Governor Wallace might seem to be the only real issues of the campaign."

Among the issues that the candidates focused on during the campaign was Jane Fonda's controversial visit to Vietnam. Thompson, then a member of the House Internal Security Committee, tried unsuccessfully to persuade his colleagues on the Committee to issue a subpoena against Fonda to answer his accusation that she had committed treason. Fonda did not testify, but A. William Olson did, to the effect that the United States Department of Justice had found no reason to prosecute Fonda for either treason or for violating the Logan Act.

Nunn's campaign was much more organized than was Thompson's. Nunn had support from numerous prominent Democrats from his state, including Gambrell, Carter, and Vandiver. By contrast, Thompson's campaign was "almost literally a one-man effort", and he started the race with virtually no footprint outside of his own district.

Endorsements
Nunn was endorsed by almost every establishment Democrat in Georgia, with the notable exception of Lieutenant Governor Lester Maddox, who did not endorse a candidate in the general election. Maddox did, however, support Nunn in his primary challenge to Gambrell.

Thompson tried to tie himself to Nixon, in the hopes of benefiting from Nixon's expected strong performance in Georgia. Nevertheless, Nixon declined to endorse Thompson when he visited Atlanta several weeks before the election. Some speculated that this may have been because the Nixon campaign was pessimistic about Thompson's chances. Instead of Nixon, both Arizona Senator Barry Goldwater, a former Republican presidential nominee, and Vice President Spiro Agnew threw their support behind Thompson.

Results

Aftermath
By defeating Thompson in the general election, Nunn became the first Democrat to win a Senate race in Georgia despite losing the white vote. Nunn's narrow victory over Thompson reflected a continuing decline in the Democratic Party's influence in Georgia, despite Nixon's landslide victory over McGovern there in the same year. Watergate further reduced the party's popularity in the state in 1974, and in that year's gubernatorial election, Republican gubernatorial candidate Ronnie Thompson lost with only 30% of the vote. When Newt Gingrich first ran unsuccessfully for Congress in 1974, he tried to model his campaign on Nunn's successful one in 1972.

References

1972
Georgia
United States Senate